Esporte Clube Águia Negra, usually known simply as Águia Negra or as Águia Negra de Rio Brilhante is a Brazilian football club from Rio Brilhante, Mato Grosso do Sul state.

As of 2022, Águia Negra is the top ranked team from Mato Grosso do Sul in CBF's national club ranking, being placed 95th overall.

History
The club was founded on May 30, 1971.

In 2001, Águia Negra won its first title, which was the Mato Grosso do Sul State Championship Second Level, beating Coxim in the final.

In 2007, the club won its second title, which was the Mato Grosso do Sul State Championship. Águia Negra beat CENE in the final. In the same year, the club competed in the Brazilian Championship Third Level, but was eliminated in the second stage. They won the state championship again in 2012.

Stadium
Águia Negra's stadium is Estádio Ninho da Águia, inaugurated in 2007, with a maximum capacity of 3,000 people.

Current squad

Achievements
  Campeonato Sul-Mato-Grossense
 Winners (4): 2007, 2012, 2019, 2020
 Second Level (2001)

References

External links
 Esporte Clube Águia Negra official website
 Esporte Clube Águia Negra at Arquivo de Clubes

Association football clubs established in 1971
Football clubs in Mato Grosso do Sul
1971 establishments in Brazil